Pál Pesthy (9 July 1873 - 7 May 1952) was a Hungarian politician and jurist, who served as Minister of Justice between 1924 and 1929. During his ministership the law being about the House of Magnates' organization (1926 XXII), some institutions of civil law, the forensic organisation's modification (1924 XV) and the last recommendation of the Civil Code were made (1928). From 1929 to 1931 he was the chairman of the Unity Party. He was a member of the House of Magnates from 1940.

References
 Magyar Életrajzi Lexikon

External links
 

1873 births
1952 deaths
Justice ministers of Hungary